The Republic of Chocolate or Hungya Chocolate Museum is a museum about chocolate in Bade District, Taoyuan City, Taiwan.

History
The museum was established in 1978.

Architecture
The museum was built with a shape of chocolate of a 20-story building. It features a greenhouse, exhibition hall, chocolate making class, restaurant and factory tours.

See also
 List of museums in Taiwan

References

2012 establishments in Taiwan
Chocolate museums
Museums established in 2012
Museums in Taoyuan City